Johann Conrad Peyer (26 December 1653 – 29 February 1712) was a Swiss anatomist who was a native of Schaffhausen.

Biography 
He studied medicine in Paris under Guichard Joseph Duverney (1648–1730), in Montpellier under Raymond Vieussens (1635–1713) and received his medical degree in 1681 at Basel. Later, he returned to Schaffhausen in order to practice medicine. Here, he performed research with Johann Jakob Wepfer (1620–1695), and Wepfer's son-in-law Johann Conrad Brunner (1653–1727).

in 1677 Peyer published Exercitatio anatomico-medica de glandulis intestinorum earumque usu et affectionibus, in which he describes the eponymous Peyer's patches. These anatomical structures are aggregated lymphatic nodules found in the lining of the small intestine. He was also the author of an influential work on veterinary medicine titled Merycologia sive de Ruminantibus et Ruminatione Commentariae.

References
 The Galileo Project Johann Conrad Peyer
 

1653 births
1712 deaths
People from Schaffhausen
17th-century Swiss physicians
18th-century Swiss physicians
Swiss anatomists